Kenneth Ebersole Brandt (November 17, 1938 – October 20, 2016) was an American businessman and politician.

Born in Elizabethtown, Pennsylvania, Brandt graduated from Elizabethtown Area High School. He owned A.F. Brandt & Sons Rendering. He served on the Elizabethtown Area School Board. He served in the Pennsylvania House of Representatives from 1973 to 1990 and was a member of the Republican Party.

References

1938 births
2016 deaths
School board members in Pennsylvania
Republican Party members of the Pennsylvania House of Representatives
People from Elizabethtown, Pennsylvania
Businesspeople from Pennsylvania
20th-century American businesspeople